A constitutional referendum was held in Benin on 2 December 1990. The main issues were changing the political system to a multi-party system, with a secondary issue as to whether there should be age limits for the President. The referendum passed with 93.2% of voters approving the change to a multi-party system and 73.3% in favour of age limits.

Results

References

1990 referendums
1990
1990 in Benin
Constitutional referendums